The Society of Mental Welfare Officers (SMWO) was a professional body for social workers (then called Mental Welfare Officers) in the United Kingdom. It was established in 1954 by the amalgamation of the National Association of Authorised Officers and the Mental Health Workers' Association.

In 1970 the society merged with six other social workers' organisations to form the British Association of Social Workers, having been a member of the Standing Conference of Organisations of Social Workers since 1962.

Social work organisations in the United Kingdom
Former mental health organisations in the United Kingdom
Organizations established in 1954
Organizations disestablished in 1970